This is a list of awards and nominations received by New Zealand-Canadian actress Anna Paquin.

Major associations

Academy Awards

Golden Globe Awards

Primetime Emmy Awards

Screen Actors Guild Awards

Other associations

Critics' Choice Awards

Drama Desk Award

Gold Derby Awards

Gotham Awards

MTV Movie & TV Awards

People's Choice Awards

Satellite Awards

Saturn Awards

Scream Awards

Teen Choice Awards

Young Artist Awards

YoungStar Awards

Critics awards

References

External links 

 

Lists of awards received by Canadian actor